Boyhood Loves is a 2001 French drama film directed by Yves Caumon. It was screened in the Un Certain Regard section at the 2001 Cannes Film Festival, where it won the Un Certain Regard Award.

Cast
 Mathieu Amalric - Paul
 Lauryl Brossier - Odile
 Fabrice Cals - Thierry
 Michèle Gary - Odette
 Roger Souza - Paul's father
 Bernard Blancan - Aimé
 Nicole Miana - Odile's mother
 Frédéric Bonpart - Jean-Marie
 Paul Crouzet - Auguste
 Deddy Dugay - Suzette

References

External links

2001 films
2000s French-language films
2001 drama films
Films directed by Yves Caumon
French drama films
2000s French films